Philippines competed at the 1983 World Championships in Athletics in Helsinki, Finland, from August 7 to 14, 1983. The championships were the first to feature both men and women's events and a full complement of events. The Philippines entered 2 athletes who competed in 3 events.

Results

Men
Track and road events

Women
Track and road events

References

Nations at the 1983 World Championships in Athletics
World Championships in Athletics
1983